Below is a list of the Australian states and territories by the Human Development Index, as of 2021, which is a comparative measure of life expectancy, literacy, education, standard of living, and overall well-being of the citizens in each states. All Australian states have a very high (greater than 0.800) HDI value. 

The Australian Capital Territory and Western Australia have a higher HDI value than Switzerland (0.962), the highest-ranked country in the world. 

As of 2021, the Australian Capital Territory is tied with the Oslo and Akershus region in Norway for the second highest HDI rating of any sub-national region in the world, behind only Zurich.

Ranking

See also
 List of countries by Human Development Index
 List of countries by inequality-adjusted Human Development Index
 List of countries by planetary pressures–adjusted Human Development Index
 List of regions of New Zealand by Human Development Index

References 

Australia
Australia
Human Development Index
Human Development Index